The Supreme Commander of the Imperial and Royal Armed Forces was the ultimate authority of the Austro-Hungarian Armed Forces – which comprised the Army, Navy and Aviation Troops of Austria-Hungary.

Highest Commander-in-Chief  
The Supreme Commander was usually the Emperor of Austria as Highest Commander-in-Chief (Allerhöchste Oberbefehl). The Emperor ran the armed forces (Bewaffnete Macht or Wehrmacht) through the Military Chancellery of His Imperial and Royal Majesty the Emperor-King (Militärkanzlei Seiner Majesty des Kaisers and Königs) that was established on 11 July 1867. Amongst its heads, who usually bore the title Adjutant General (Generaladjutant), were:
 Friedrich von Beck-Rzikowsky (11 Jul 1867–1881)
 Arthur Freiherr von Bolfras (1889–5 Ja 1917)

In his old age Franz Joseph I only rarely exercised the function of supreme commander in person. Instead, in 1905 after the death of Field marshal Archduke Albert - who had taken over the post in 1866 from General Benedek and held in until his death in 1895 - he appointed Archduke Friedrich of Austria-Teschen as his representative using the style: At the disposal of the Supreme Commander - His Imperial and Royal Highness General of Infantry and Inspector of the Army Archduke Friedrich (Zur Disposition des Allerhöchsten Oberbefehls - se. k.u.k. Hoheit General der Infanterie und Armeeinspektor Erzherzog Friedrich).

Besides Friedrich, whose duties were mainly ceremonial, Archduke Heir Apparent Franz Ferdinand had a great influence on the armed forces in the last years of the monarchy, and worked hard to keep them united and to expand them. In 1898, after a career as an officer, he was appointed "at the disposal of the Supreme Commander" (zur Disposition des Allerhöchsten Oberbefehles), in order to oversee the army as a whole as well as the navy. To that end, from 1899, he maintained his own military chancellery (headed from Dec 1905 to autumn 1911 by Alexander Brosch von Aarenau and from autumn 1911 to June 1914 by Carl von Bardolff), at Belvedere Palace, which was successively expanded by Brosch into a secondary government (Nebenregierung). In 1913 the heir to the Emperor was appointed as Inspector General of the Armed Forces (Generalinspektor der gesamten bewaffneten Macht); at his request Franz Joseph I appointed General Conrad as Chief of the General Staff (1906–1911 and 1912–1 Mar 1917). The CGS, since the reform of 1895 called the CGS of the Armed Forces (Chef des Generalstabs für die gesamte bewaffnete Macht), had the right to a personal audience with the monarch (without the presence of the Minister of War), whereby the CGS was superior to the Defence Ministry as well as the Imperial Chancellery, and the Inspector General of Troops was subordinated to him - only the heir apparent outranked him.

At the onset of World War I, the Emperor appointed Friedrich as commander in chief, following the usual practice in times of crisis to appoint a serving officer to exercise high command of the army. Friedrich assumed this function until 2 Dec 1916, when the new Emperor, Charles I, took over supreme command himself.

Charles himself gave up the supreme command at the end of the war, in order not to have to sign the peace treaty and terms of surrender personally.

List of officeholders

Supreme commanders 

{{Officeholder table
| order             = 3
| image             = Emperor karl of austria-hungary 1917.png
| military_rank     = His k.u.k. Apostolic Majesty Grand Admiral and Colonel General
| officeholder      = Charles I of Austria
| officeholder_sort = Franz, Charles
| officeholder_note = {{efn|Emperor and Apostolic King, etc., Supreme Commander (Kaiser and apostol. König, etc., Allerhöchster Oberbefehl) }} 
| born_year         = 1887
| died_year         = 1922
| term_start        = 2 December 1916
| term_end          = 3 November 1918
| timeinoffice      = 
| ref               = 
}}

 Deputies 

|-style="text-align:center;"
| colspan=8|VacantFeb 1895 – 1898

|-style="text-align:center;"
| colspan=8|Vacant1913 – 1916

|-style="text-align:center;"
| colspan=8|VacantFeb 1917 – Nov 1918

 See also 

Minister of War (Austria-Hungary)
Austrian Minister of Defence (Austria-Hungary)
Minister of Defense (Austria)
Austro-Hungarian General Staff
Chief of the General Staff (Austria)

Notes

 References 
 

 Literature 
 
 The Army of Francis Joseph'' by Gunther E. Rothenberg

High command
!High command
High command, Austria-Hungary
1High command